The HSBC UK National Cycling Centre is a multipurpose cycling venue in Sportcity, Manchester, United Kingdom. It includes an indoor Velodrome and a BMX arena and outdoor mountain bike trials. It also has offices for British Cycling, the governing body for cycling in Britain.

Venues

Velodrome

The velodrome of the HSBC UK National Cycling Centre was built in 1994 for Manchester Olympic bids. It was Britain's first indoor cycling track. It hosted track cycling events in the 2002 Commonwealth Games, the Revolution series and the UCI Track Cycling World Championships a record three times (1996, 2000 and 2008). More than 15 track cycling world records have been set on the track. The velodrome has been cited as a catalyst for Britain's successes in track cycling since 2002 and nowadays claims to be one of the busiest in the world.

Sports Court

The centre of the velodrome has a 40m x 38m sprung wooden floor with courts marked out for 10 x Badminton, 2 x Basketball, 2 x Futsal, and 2 x Korfball.

BMX complex

British Cycling and Manchester City Council, in partnership with New East Manchester worked together to deliver the  National Indoor BMX Centre which opened in 2011. It was designed by Ellis Williams Architects, and built by contractors Sir Robert McAlpine.
The £24 million complex is the only permanent indoor BMX track in the United Kingdom. It has 2,000 seats, a BMX area and offices for the headquarters of British Cycling.

Mountain bike trials
There are mountain bike trails through Clayton Vale, a green space through the Medlock River Valley Corridor, since 2013. The trails are 12 km in length including four skill levels from easy to expert. The National Cycling Centre is the Trail head for this route.

There is also a Mountain Bike and BMX Skills Zone, featuring a pump track and technical trail features.

References

External links

Cycle racing in England
Sports venues in Manchester
Cycling in Greater Manchester